The Wheel of the Law is a lost 1916 American silent drama film produced and distributed by Metro Pictures and starring Emily Stevens. It was directed by George D. Baker.

Cast
Emily Stevens as Mona Mainard
Frank R. Mills as John Norton (*this Frank Mills, actor born 1870 died 1921)
Raymond McKee as Tommy Mainard
Edwin Holt as 'Big' Bill Ryan
Roma Raymond as Pearl Le Claire
Harry Davenport as John Daniels
Jerome N. Wilson as Jimmy McClane
Charles Eldridge as Frank Wills
Kalman Matus (unidentified role)
Thomas McGrath (unidentified role)

References

External links

1916 films
American silent feature films
Lost American films
Films directed by George D. Baker
Metro Pictures films
1916 drama films
Silent American drama films
American black-and-white films
1916 lost films
Lost drama films
1910s American films